Griveaudia vieui is a species of moth of the  family Callidulidae. It is found on Madagascar.

References

Callidulidae
Moths of Madagascar
Moths of Africa
Moths described in 1958